Kępka Szlachecka  is a village in the administrative district of Gmina Kowal, within Włocławek County, Kuyavian-Pomeranian Voivodeship, in north-central Poland. However a part of the village lies within Gmina Choceń.

References

Villages in Włocławek County